Tao Qian (132–194), courtesy name Gongzu, was a government official and warlord who lived during the late Eastern Han dynasty of China. He is best known for serving as the Governor of Xu Province.

Early life and career
Tao Qian was from Danyang Commandery, which is around present-day Ma'anshan, Anhui. As a young man, he was known for being studious and honest. While in the service of the Han dynasty, he led the armed forces in Danyang Commandery to suppress rebellions.

When the Yellow Turban Rebellion broke out, he was appointed as the Inspector of Xu Province and he succeeded in clearing the area of rebel forces. He was sent to the northwestern frontiers during the Liang Province Rebellion, where he served under Zhang Wen. During the campaign, he insulted Zhang Wen and angered him. However, Sun Jian and Dong Zhuo served on the same campaign, and both of them also were unhappy with Zhang Wen's leadership as well. In the chaos of Dong Zhuo's coup d'état and the battles that followed, Tao Qian, having returned to Xu Province, gained control of the neighbouring Yang Province. However, after that he showed no ambition to expand his territory any further.

Tao Qian was responsible for starting the careers of Wang Lang, Zhu Zhi and Chen Deng, all of whom would play fairly important roles in the historical events leading to the end of the Han dynasty. However, at the same time he was prone to joining forces with unscrupulous characters, such as Ze Rong, Cao Hong and Que Xuan, and on the other hand not appointing Zhao Yu, a loyal and capable subordinate, to a position of trust. Those who did not respond to his requests to serve him, such as Zhang Zhao and Lü Fan, he had imprisoned, and he also attempted to harm the family of Sun Ce, who was serving Yuan Shu at the time.

Cao Cao's invasion of Xu Province

In 193, Cao Cao's father Cao Song was travelling through Xu Province to join Cao Cao in Yan Province. Tao Qian's subordinate, Zhang Kai, attacked the baggage train, killing Cao Song and escaping with the loot. The death of Cao Song prompted Cao Cao, then the Governor of Yan province, to lead an army to invade Xu Province and massacre countless civilians – ostensibly to avenge his father. Tao Qian requested aid from his allies in Qing Province, and was joined by Tian Kai and his subordinate Liu Bei, and with the reinforcements  Tao Qian was able to resist Cao Cao. Cao Cao's forces eventually ran out of supplies and had to withdraw back to Yan Province.

Tian Kai returned north, but Tao Qian provided Liu Bei with several thousand troops from Danyang, so Liu Bei switched his service from Tian Kai to Tao Qian.

Cao Cao launched a second invasion in 194, but was forced to turn back when Zhang Miao and Chen Gong rebelled against him and helped a rival warlord, Lü Bu, seize control of his base in Yan Province.

Tao Qian died of illness in 194. His subordinates Mi Zhu and Mi Fang invited Liu Bei to be the new Governor of Xu Province. Liu Bei initially declined and offered the governorship to Yuan Shu, but Kong Rong eventually convinced him to accept.

In Romance of the Three Kingdoms
In the 14th-century historical novel Romance of the Three Kingdoms, Tao Qian is described as a ‘warm and sincere man’, and Zhang Kai's attack on Cao Song is depicted as being done against his will. Later, after Liu Bei helps him drive off Cao Cao's invasion, Tao Qian offers Liu Bei the governorship of Xu Province three times, but Liu Bei declines every time, saying that such an action would be seen as dishonourable. In 194, on his death bed, Tao Qian attempts one last time to ask Liu Bei to take over; Liu Bei still refuses his plea. Tao Qian dies peacefully soon after, and Liu Bei finally accepts his dying request after the common people of Xuzhou and his own brothers exhort him to take command.

Literary and cultural references 
Tao Qian appears as a playable faction in Total War: Three Kingdoms, and is prominently featured in the game as an opponent of Cao Cao.

See also
 Lists of people of the Three Kingdoms

References

Bibliography
 Chen, Shou (3rd century). Records of the Three Kingdoms (Sanguozhi).
 
 Fan, Ye (5th century). Book of the Later Han (Houhanshu).
 Luo, Guanzhong (14th century). Romance of the Three Kingdoms (Sanguo Yanyi).
 Pei, Songzhi (5th century). Annotations to Records of the Three Kingdoms (Sanguozhi zhu).

132 births
194 deaths

Han dynasty warlords
People from East China
Political office-holders in Beijing
Han dynasty politicians
Political office-holders in Jiangsu